Vikram Gokhale (14 November 1945 – 26 November 2022) was an Indian film, television and stage actor, noted for his roles in Marathi theatre, Hindi films and television. He was the son of the Veteran Marathi theater and film actor, Chandrakant Gokhale.

Gokhale made his directorial debut in 2010, with the Marathi film Aaghaat. Produced by Sprint Arts Creation in 2013, he won the National Film Award for Best Actor category for his Marathi film Anumati.

Early and personal life
Gokhale was born in Pune, Bombay Presidency on 14 November 1945.  His great grandmother, Durgabai Kamat, was the first female actor of the Indian screen, while his grandmother Kamlabai Gokhale (Kamlabai Kamat at that time) was the first female child actor of Indian cinema. His father Chandrakant Gokhale was a veteran Marathi film and stage artist and has acted in over 70 Marathi and Hindi films.

Gokhale ran a real estate firm called Sujata Farms in Pune. He was also a social activist. His family's charitable foundation provides financial support for disabled soldiers, Children of lepers, and education of orphan children.

In February 2016, due to a throat ailment, Gokhale retired from stage activities, though he continued film work. 

He was admitted to Deenanath Mangeshkar Hospital on 5 November 2022 in Pune, where he died due to multiple organ failure on 26 November 2022, at the age of 77.

Filmography

Films

Plays 
 Khara Sangaycha Tar as Criminal Lawyer (based on The Witness for the Prosecution by Agatha Christie)
 Katha as Shyamrao Lele
 Ke Dil Abhi Bhara Nahi

Television

References

External links

 

1946 births
2022 deaths
Male actors from Maharashtra
Indian male television actors
Indian male stage actors
Male actors in Marathi cinema
Male actors in Hindi cinema
Male actors in Marathi theatre
Marathi actors
Recipients of the Sangeet Natak Akademi Award
Best Actor National Film Award winners
Male actors in Marathi television
20th-century Indian male actors
21st-century Indian male actors